October 1974 general election may refer to:
 1974 Belizean general election
 1974 Botswana general election
 1974 Kenyan general election
 1974 Northern Territory general election
 October 1974 United Kingdom general election
 1974 Yukon general election